Pseudodynerus is a small Neotropical genus of potter wasps (Hymenoptera: Vespidae: Eumeninae) currently containing  16 species.

The known species are:

Pseudodynerus auratoides (Bertoni)
Pseudodynerus carpenteri Hermes & Melo
Pseudodynerus crypticus Hermes & Melo
Pseudodynerus garcetei Hermes
Pseudodynerus griseolus (Brèthes)
Pseudodynerus griseus (Fox)
Pseudodynerus hallinani Bequaert
Pseudodynerus luctuosus (Saussure)
Pseudodynerus maxillaris (Saussure)
Pseudodynerus migonei (Bertoni)
Pseudodynerus obesus Hermes & Melo
Pseudodynerus penicillatus (Zavattari)
Pseudodynerus quadrisectus (Say)
Pseudodynerus serratus (Fox)
Pseudodynerus singularis Hermes & Melo
Pseudodynerus subapicalis (Fox)

References

Biological pest control wasps
Potter wasps
Taxa named by Henri Louis Frédéric de Saussure
Hymenoptera genera